The 1997 Italian Superturismo Championship was the eleventh edition of the Italian Superturismo Championship. The season began in Monza on 20 April and finished in Vallelunga on 12 October, after ten rounds. Emanuele Naspetti won the championship, driving a BMW 320i; the German manufacturer won the constructors' championship, while Massimo Pigoli took the privateers' trophy.

Teams and drivers

Race calendar and results

Championship standings

Drivers' Championship

Manufacturers' Trophy

External links
1997 Drivers List
1997 Standings

1997 in Italian motorsport
Italian Superturismo Championship